The 1927 Utah Agricultural Aggies football team was an American football team that represented Utah Agricultural College in the Rocky Mountain Conference (RMC) during the 1927 college football season. In their ninth season under head coach Dick Romney, the Aggies compiled a 3–4–1 record (3–3–1 against RMC opponents), finished fourth in the conference, and outscored opponents by a total of 129 to 53.

Schedule

References

Utah Agricultural
Utah State Aggies football seasons
Utah State Aggies football